Wenyingzhuangia is a genus of bacteria from the family of Flavobacteriaceae. Wenyingzhuangia is named after the microbiologist and mycologist Wen-Ying Zhuang.

References

Flavobacteria
Bacteria genera
Taxa described in 2014